The Times Tower, also known as the New Central Bank Tower, is an office tower in Nairobi, Kenya. With 38 floors, along with a 7-storey banking complex and an 11-split storey car park, it is served by 10 elevators.

Overview
The only tenant of the building is the Kenya Revenue Authority, who use it for tax remissions and administration, and it serves as a location for taxpayer education.

The building is often the site of long queues, especially near the 20th of every month when taxes are due to be paid.

Security to the building is tight, with all guests going through screening by guards using metal detectors. It is well guarded by armed policemen at all times. The entrance is different from the exit to ensure easy handling of visitors.

To get into the building beyond the ground floor requires either a Kenyan ID card for locals or passports for foreigners. Entry without the documents is not allowed unless the member of staff being visited leaves his ID documents in place of the visitor.

Some floors are off limits for non-workers, such as the seventh floor.

Gallery

See also
 List of tallest buildings in Kenya
 List of tallest buildings in Africa

References

External links
 
 Kenya Revenue Authority home page
 

Office buildings completed in 2000
Buildings and structures in Nairobi
Skyscraper office buildings in Kenya